The East Asia Institute is an autonomous research institute and think tank of the National University of Singapore (NUS) in Singapore. 

It may also refer to one of several research institutes, think tanks, and academic institutes:

 East Asia Institute (Korea) (founded in 2002), an independent think tank in Seoul, South Korea.
 East Asia Institute (Ludwigshafen) (founded in 1989), an academic department at Ludwigshafen University of Applied Sciences, Germany.
 The Institute of East Asian Studies at Leipzig University, Germany.
 Weatherhead East Asian Institute (founded in 1949), a community of scholars affiliated with Columbia's schools covering China, Japan, Taiwan, Hong Kong, Korea, Mongolia, Tibet, and Southeast Asia. (Formerly "East Asia Institute at Columbia University;" renamed 'Weatherhead' in 2002).
 East Asia Institute at the University of Oklahoma at Tulsa, which promotes U.S. K-12 education about Asia and Asian languages.
 East Asian Institute of Management (founded in 2001), Singapore
 A study-abroad program for non-Japanese at Tokyo Christian University.
 The Institute of East Asian Studies (founded 1978) at the University of California, Berkeley